is a 2010 Japanese crime drama television series developed by Hideaki Tatematsu and Masaru Ōta from Fuji TV and Kyodo Television respectively. Starring alongside Sakai is Ryō Nishikido and Anne Watanabe, the latter using the mononym "Anne".

Cast

Main characters
Masato Sakai as Date Kazuyoshi
Ryō Nishikido as Takeshi Kudō
Anne Watanabe as Asuka Miyagi

Supporting characters
Hiroyuki Hirayama as Junnosuke Kurusu
Ryō as Saeko Katagiri
Ren Osugi as Kuniharu Mikami
Takeshi Kaga as Masaaki Izutsu

Home media
A DVD box set for the series was released on January 19, 2011. Bonus materials include a behind-the-scenes featurette, an interview with the cast, textless ending sequence, and the series trailer.

References

External links
Official Fuji TV site

2010 in Japanese television
2010 Japanese television series debuts
2010 Japanese television series endings
Television shows set in Japan